Rebecca Newbold Van Trump (1839–1935) was an American painter known for her portraits and miniatures.

Van Trump was born in 1839 in Pennsylvania. She studied at the Pennsylvania Academy of the Fine Arts in Philadelphia and the Académie Julian in Paris, France. At the Académie Julian she was taught by Tony Robert-Fleury.

Van Trump exhibited her work at the Woman's Building at the 1893 World's Columbian Exposition in Chicago, Illinois. She also exhibited at the Paris Salon, the Art Institute of Chicago, and the Pennsylvania Academy of the Fine Arts. 

Van Trump died in 1935.

References

External links

1839 births 
1935 deaths
19th-century American women artists
20th-century American women artists
Artists from Pennsylvania
Académie Julian alumni
Pennsylvania Academy of the Fine Arts alumni